This is a list of electoral divisions and wards in the ceremonial county of Wiltshire in South West England. All changes since the re-organisation of local government following the passing of the Local Government Act 1972 are shown. The number of councillors elected for each electoral division or ward is shown in brackets.

Unitary authority councils

Wiltshire
Electoral Divisions of the Wiltshire Council unitary authority from 4 June 2009 to 6 May 2021, each electing one councillor:

Electoral Divisions since 6 May 2021, again each electing one councillor:

Borough of Swindon
Wards of the new Borough of Swindon unitary authority, created in 1997, from 4 May 2000 to 3 May 2012:

Wards since 3 May 2012:

† minor boundary changes in 2015

Former county council

Wiltshire
Electoral Divisions of Wiltshire County Council from 1 April 1974 (first election 12 April 1973) to 7 May 1981:

† minor boundary changes in 1980

Electoral Divisions from 7 May 1981 to 6 May 1993:

Electoral Divisions from 6 May 1993 to 5 May 2005:

Electoral Divisions from 5 May 2005 to 4 June 2009:

Former district councils

Kennet
Wards from 1 April 1974 (first election 7 June 1973) to 6 May 1976:

Wards from 6 May 1976 to 1 May 2003:

Wards from 1 May 2003 to 1 April 2009 (district abolished):

North Wiltshire
Wards from 1 April 1974 (first election 7 June 1973) to 5 May 1983:

Wards from 5 May 1983 to 1 May 2003:

Wards from 1 May 2003 to 3 May 2007:

Wards from 3 May 2007 to 1 April 2009 (district abolished):

Salisbury
Wards from 1 April 1974 (first election 7 June 1973) to 6 May 1976:

Wards from 6 May 1976 to 1 May 2003:

Wards from 1 May 2003 to 1 April 2009 (district abolished):

Thamesdown
Wards from 1 April 1974 (first election 7 June 1973) to 6 May 1976:

Wards from 6 May 1976 to 4 May 2000:

In 1997 the district was converted into the unitary authority of Swindon.

West Wiltshire
Wards from 1 April 1974 (first election 7 June 1973) to 5 May 1983:

Wards from 5 May 1983 to 1 May 2003:

Wards from 1 May 2003 to 3 May 2007:

Wards from 3 May 2007 to 1 April 2009 (district abolished):

Electoral divisions of Wiltshire Council by parliamentary constituency

Chippenham
Atworth and Whitley, Bradford-on-Avon North, Bradford-on-Avon South, Cepen Park, Chippenham Allington, Chippenham Audley, Chippenham Avon, Chippenham Hill Rise, Chippenham London Road, Chippenham Monkton Park, Chippenham Park, Chippenham Pewsham, Chippenham Redland, Chippenham Westcroft/Queens, Corsham, Holt, Lacock with Neston and Gastard, Manor Vale, Melksham North, Melksham Spa, Melksham Without, Melksham Woodrow, Paxcroft, Pickwick.

Devizes
Aldbourne, All Cannings, Bedwyn, Bishops Cannings, Bromham and Rowde, Bulford, Burbage, Cheverell, Collingbourne, Devizes East, Devizes North, Devizes South, Durrington, Lavingtons, Ludgershall, Marlborough East, Marlborough West, Milton Lilbourne, Netheravon, Ogbourne, Pewsey, Pewsey Vale, Potterne, Ramsbury, Roundway, Seend, Shalbourne, Tidworth, Perham Down and Ludgershall South, Upavon, Urchfont, West Selkley.

North Wiltshire
Ashton Keynes and Minety, Box, Bremhill, Brinkworth and The Somerfords, Calne Abberd, Calne Chilvester, Calne Lickhill, Calne Marden, Calne Priestley, Calne Quemerford, Calne Without, Colerne, Cricklade, Hilmarton, Kington Langley, Kington St. Michael, Lyneham, Malmesbury, Nettleton, Purton, Royal Wootton Bassett East, Royal Wootton Bassett North, Royal Wootton Bassett South, St. Paul Malmesbury Without and Sherston, The Lydiards and Broad Town.

Salisbury
Alderbury and Whiteparish, Amesbury East, Amesbury West, Bemerton, Bishopdown, Chalke Valley, Downton and Redlynch, Ebble, Fisherton and Bemerton Village, Harnham East, Harnham West, Laverstock, Lower Wylye and Woodford Valley, St Edmund and Milford, St Mark and Stratford, St Martin and Milford, St Paul, Till Valley and Wylye, Upper Bourne, Idmiston and Winterbourne, Wilton, Winterslow.

South West Wiltshire
Dilton Marsh, Donhead, Ethandune, Fonthill and Nadder, Knoyle, Mid Wylye Valley, Shearwater, Southwick and Wingfield, Summerham, Tisbury and Fovant, Trowbridge Adcroft, Trowbridge College, Trowbridge Drynham, Trowbridge John of Gaunt, Trowbridge Park, Warminster East, Warminster West, Westbury Ham, Westbury Laverton, Western and Mere.

Electoral wards of Swindon Borough Council by parliamentary constituency

North Swindon
Abbey Meads, Blunsdon, Covingham and Nythe, Gorse Hill and Pinehurst, Haydon Wick, Highworth, Moredon, Penhill, St Margaret, St Philip, Western.

South Swindon
Central, Dorcan, Eastcott, Freshbrook and Grange Park, Old Town and Lawn, Parks, Ridgeway, Shaw and Nine Elms, Toothill and Westlea, Walcot, Wroughton and Chiseldon.

See also
List of parliamentary constituencies in Wiltshire

References

Electoral wards
Electoral wards
Wiltshire